Steve McCann (born 3 February 1983) is an Australian BMX rider.  McCann turned pro at the age of 16 in 1999.

McCann guest-starred alongside fellow Australian extreme sportsman, Renton Millar in an episode of Australian soap opera Neighbours in 2002. McCann earned Gold at X Games 17 for BMX Freestyle Big Air and Silver in BMX Freestyle Vert. At X Games 18 He earned Gold for BMX Freestyle Big Air.

References

1983 births
Living people
Australian male cyclists
Australian people of Irish descent
BMX riders
Cyclists from Melbourne
X Games athletes